The Boston Typewriter Orchestra (BTO) is an American collective percussion ensemble for typewriter and voice based in the Boston area. It was founded in 2004.

Formation 
One night in 2004, Boston-area artist Tim Devin was presented with the gift of a child's typewriter at a bar. His typing eventually annoyed the waitress who asked him to stop, whereupon he responded "It's OK, ma'am. I'm the conductor of the Boston Typewriter Orchestra". Thinking there was something to the idea, he assembled a group of interested performers on the night of October 20th, 2004 in Somerville.

An office setting was quickly decided upon as an overarching theme for live performances. The members (usually numbering between four and eight people) perform wearing white shirts and ties, engage in typical workplace banter and write office-themed lyrics to satirical or comedic effect. The typewriters are utilized in a rhythmic fashion while melodic elements are supplied by the vocalists. The group uses several varieties of manual typewriters from such manufacturers as Underwood, Smith Corona, Hermes,  Remington and Royal.

The Boston Typewriter Orchestra began performing at house parties, eventually expanding venues to clubs, arts festivals and museums. Local and national media appearances soon followed. The group appears in the documentary California Typewriter and their song "Entropy Begins at the Office" has been used in promotional ads for the film  The Post.

Notable performances and appearances 
 November 27, 2006 – Paradise Rock Club with Amanda Palmer
 February 4, 2007 – Weekend Today, NBC
 October 9, 2008 – Boston Orchestra Makes Typewriters Sing, NPR
 June, 21 2011 – America's Got Talent, NBC
 January 31, 2015 – Langston Hughes Google Doodle
 September 2, 2016 – California Typewriter
 April 5, 2017 – Playing Against Type, Great Big Story (CNN)
 September 27, 2017 –  Outlook, BBC World Service
 December 30, 2017 –  The Post (ad)
 February 9, 2020 - The Blunderwood Portable
 August 17, 2020 - The Kelly Clarkson Show, NBCUniversal Television Distribution

Discography 
 The Revolution Will Be Typewritten! (2006)
 Overtime at the Piano Factory – Live (2008)
 Termination Without Prejudice, Volume 1 (2017)
 Workstation to Workstation (2020)
 Delegation: The Remixes (2021)

References 

Musical groups established in 2004
Musical groups from Boston